The 2015–16 3. Liga was the 23rd 3. liga season in Slovakia since its establishment in 1993. The league was composed of 66 teams divided in four different groups of 16 each and 3. liga Západ (West) includes 18 teams. Teams are divided into four divisions: 3. liga Bratislava, 3. liga Západ (West), 3. liga Stred (Central), 3. liga Východ (Eastern), according to geographical separation.

TIPOS III. liga Bratislava

Locations

League table

Top goalscorers
Updated through matches played on 11 June 2016.

TIPOS III. liga Západ

Locations

League table

Top goalscorers
Updated through matches played on 15 June 2016.

TIPOS III. liga Stred

Locations

League table

Top goalscorers
Updated through matches played on 15 June 2016.

TIPOS III. liga Východ

Locations

League table

Top goalscorers
Updated through matches played on 15 June 2016.

References 

3
Slovak Third League
3. Liga (Slovakia) seasons